Romulea flava, also known by its common name Greenbract froetang, is a species of flowering plant from the genus Romulea.

The plant is native to the Cape Provinces and has been introduced into Australian states of New South Wales, Victoria and Western Australia.

It grows to a height of 10 to 15cm and has flowers that are white or yellow on the outside with an inner yellow cup. The flowers only open on days that are warn and sunny and unually only in the afternoon.

It has four accepted Infraspecifics :
 Romulea flava var. flava
 Romulea flava var. minor (Bég.) M.P.de Vos
 Romulea flava var. hirsuta (Bég.) M.P.de Vos
 Romulea flava var. viridiflora (Bég.) M.P.de Vos

References

flava